Worli-Haji Ali Sea Link (WHAL) is a proposed bridge with pre-stressed concrete viaduct approaches. It will link Worli to Haji Ali section over sea. It is part of a Western Freeway project.

If built, it will have the country's first cloverleaf interchange flyover built entirely over sea, and it would be the first project to be undertaken on a design-build-operate-transfer (DBOT) basis by MSRDC.

History
On 28 June 2010, Maharashtra State Road Development Corporation (MSRDC) signed a contract with Reliance Sea Link One (RSLOPL), a consortium of Reliance Infrastructure and Hyundai Engineering and Construction to construct the Worli-Haji Ali Sea Link bridge. On 13 January 2011, Reliance Infrastructure received clearance to construct the sea link from the Ministry of Environment and Forests. Construction was expected to start in March 2011, with a completion date of June 2014. , the project has not been started and may be scrapped.

Alternatives

The Haji Ali Mahalaxmi Project can be an alternative to the Worli-Haji Ali Sea Link. The Haji Ali Mahalaxmi Project aims to create a 6 Acres public open space. The proposal will not only benefit the millions of people who throng the Sea Face but also the people visiting the religious monuments of Mahalaxmi Temple and Haji Ali Dargah.

See also
Vikhroli-Koparkhairane Link Road
Pamban Bridge
Bandra-Worli Sea Link

References

External links
Reliance Infra touted for Worli-Haji Ali sea link

Transport in Mumbai
Bridges in Maharashtra
Cantilever bridges
Road bridges in India